The Oldest Rookie is an American crime drama that aired from September 16, 1987, until January 13, 1988.

Premise
A police veteran with a desk job wants to become a street cop again, this means he will get assigned a rookie partner.

Cast
Paul Sorvino as Officer Ike Porter
D.W. Moffett as Detective Tony Jonas
Raymond J. Barry as Lieutenant Marco Zaga
Marshall Bell as Detective Gordon Lane
Patrick Cronin as Chief Black

Episodes

References

External links

1987 American television series debuts
1988 American television series endings
1980s American crime drama television series
English-language television shows
CBS original programming
Television series by ABC Studios